Catbalogan, officially the City of Catbalogan, is a 5th class component city and capital of the province of Samar, Philippines. According to the 2020 census, it has a population of 106,440 people.

It is Samar's main commercial, trading, educational, financial and political center. The city is the gateway to the region's three Samar provinces.

Catbalogan's patron saint is St. Bartholomew the Apostle whose feast day is August 24.

The Philippine Army's 8th Infantry Division (Stormtroopers) is based at Camp General Vicente Lukban, Barangay Maulong, Catbalogan City. The camp is named in honor of Gen. Vicente Lukbán, a Filipino officer in Gen. Emilio Aguinaldo's staff during the Philippine Revolution and the politico-military chief of Samar and Leyte during the Philippine–American War.

History

Catbalogan was founded in October 1596 by Spanish Jesuit priests and became the capital of the entire island of Samar. Friar Francisco de Otazo, S.J., who arrived in the Philippines in 1596, founded the Catbalogan Mission and was thus the first missionary to bring the Catholic faith to the people of Catbalogan.

In 1627, Catbalogan was raised to the status of residencia (residence or central house) and among its dependencies were Paranas where, in 1629, Fr. Pedro Estrada actively evangelized the area and Calbiga where he took whiterocks or grey limestone to use as building blocks for its church. The church has some arc-like stone roof that was pasted together to dry on each block, giving an arching force to the side. On October 17, 1768, Catbalogan was ceded to the Franciscans who took over from the Jesuits. The first Franciscan parish priest was Fray Jose Fayo, OFM.

During the early days of Spanish colonization of the Philippines in the 16th century, Samar was under the jurisdiction of Cebu but later was declared a separate province. In 1735, Samar and Leyte were united into one province with Carigara, in Leyte, as the capital. The union, however, did not prove satisfactory. In 1768, Catbalogan became the provincial capital when Samar separated from Leyte and became an independent province. Paranas (with Calbiga) was then separated from Catbalogan as an independent town. In 1882, Jiabong (with Motiong) separated from Catbalogan as an independent town.

On December 31, 1898, during the Philippine Revolution, Gen. Vicente Lukban arrived in Catbalogan and put Samar under his jurisdiction.

On January 27, 1900, the Americans captured Catbalogan during the Philippine–American War (1899–1902). On June 17, 1902, a provincial civil government was established on Samar Island by an act of the Philippine Commission with Julio Llorente of Cebu as the first governor of Samar.

On May 24, 1942, during World War II, Japanese forces landed in Barrio Pangdan on early morning and occupied the capital. On October 28, 1944, American and Filipino forces liberated Catbalogan from the Japanese.

In 1948, the barrios of Jiabong, Jiaan, Malino, San Fernando, Casapa, Camoroboan, Lologayan, Magcabitas, Paglayogan, Dogongan, Bayog, and Malobago were separated to form the municipality of Jiabong.

On June 19, 1965, the Philippine Congress, along with the province's three congressmen, Eladio T. Balite (1st District), Fernando R. Veloso (2nd District) and Felipe J. Abrigo (3rd District), approved Republic Act No. 4221 dividing Samar into three provinces, namely Western Samar, Eastern Samar and Northern Samar, respectively.  Catbalogan thus ceased to be the capital of the whole island-province after enjoying the prestige of being the premier town of Samar for 197 years since 1768.

On June 21, 1969, under Republic Act No. 5650, Western Samar was renamed Samar with Catbalogan remaining as the capital.

The greatest calamities to occur in Catbalogan were big fires.  The April 1, 1957 conflagration, considered as the most destructive one, caused damage to properties in the amount of thirty million pesos. The next was on May 19, 1969, where damage was estimated at twenty million pesos and the more than century-old Saint Bartholomew Roman Catholic Church was razed to the ground.  Paradoxically, like the proverbial Phoenix, each time Catbalogan suffered under the throes of these calamities, better buildings and infrastructures emerged from the ashes.

Cityhood

As early as 1960, Catbalogan already agitated to become a city. In 1969, Rep. Fernando P. Veloso sponsored House Bill No. 1867 creating Catbalogan into a city. The bill was being deliberated in the Philippine Senate, but the blaze of 1969 unfortunately caused it to be shelved. Subsequent efforts were made by Catbalogan political leaders, including former Representative Catalino V. Figueroa, during his term, to make Catbalogan's cityhood dream a reality despite strong and rabid opposition by the League of Cities of the Philippines, particularly Catbalogan City's neighboring Calbayog under the administration of Mayor Mel Senen Sarmiento.

On March 15, 2007, Catbalogan finally attained its cityhood. Under the sponsorship of Senator Alfredo S. Lim and by virtue of Republic Act No. 9391, Catbalogan was converted into a component city known as the CITY of CATBALOGAN following a unanimous vote by the Philippine Senate. Senator Manuel Villar, Jr. (President of the Senate), Congressman Jose De Venecia, Jr. (Speaker of the House of Representatives), Oscar G. Yabes (Secretary of the Senate), Roberto P. Nazareno (Secretary General, House of Representatives) and Gloria Macapagal Arroyo (President of the Philippines) were among its signatories.  The residents of Catbalogan overwhelmingly ratified this change through a Comelec plebiscite on June 16, 2007, with over 92% "Yes" votes for cityhood.

However, Catbalogan temporarily lost its cityhood, along with 15 other cities, after the Supreme Court of the Philippines, in a very close 6–5 vote, granted a petition filed by the League of Cities of the Philippines, and declared the cityhood law (RA 9391) which allowed the town to acquire its city status, unconstitutional.

On December 10, 2008, Catbalogan and the other 15 cities affected filed a motion for reconsideration with the court.  More than a year later, on December 22, 2009, acting on said appeal, the court reversed its earlier ruling as it ruled that "at the end of the day, the passage of the amendatory law (regarding the criteria for cityhood as set by Congress) is no different from the enactment of a law, i.e., the cityhood laws specifically exempting a particular political subdivision from the criteria earlier mentioned. Congress, in enacting the exempting law/s, effectively decreased the already codified indicators."  As such, the cityhood status of Catbalogan was effectively restored.

On August 23, 2010, the court reinstated its ruling on November 18, 2008, causing Catbalogan and 15 cities to become regular municipalities. Finally, on February 15, 2011, Catbalogan becomes a city again including the 15 municipalities declaring that the conversion to cityhood met all legal requirements.

After six years of legal battle, in its board resolution, the League of Cities of the Philippines acknowledged and recognized the cityhood of Catbalogan and 15 other cities.

Geography

Barangays

Catbalogan City is politically subdivided into 57 barangays.

 Albalate
 Bagongon
 Bangon
 Basiao
 Buluan
 Bunuanan
 Cabugawan
 Cagudalo
 Cagusipan
 Cagutian
 Cagutsan
 Canhawan Guti
 Canlapwas (Poblacion 15)
 Cawayan
 Cinco
 Darahuway Daco
 Darahuway Guti
 Estaka
 Guindapunan
 Guinsorongan
 Ibol
 Iguid
 Lagundi
 Libas
 Lobo
 Manguehay
 Maulong (Oraa)
 Mercedes
 Mombon
 New Mahayag (Anayan)
 Old Mahayag
 Palanyogon
 Pangdan
 Payao
 Poblacion 1 (Barangay 1)
 Poblacion 2 (Barangay 2)
 Poblacion 3 (Barangay 3)
 Poblacion 4 (Barangay 4)
 Poblacion 5 (Barangay 5)
 Poblacion 6 (Barangay 6)
 Poblacion 7 (Barangay 7)
 Poblacion 8 (Barangay 8)
 Poblacion 9 (Barangay 9)
 Poblacion 10 (Barangay 10 : Monsanto Street)
 Poblacion 11 (Barangay 11)
 Poblacion 12 (Barangay 12)
 Poblacion 13 (Barangay 13)
 Muñoz (Poblacion 14)
 Pupua
 Rama
 San Andres
 San Pablo
 San Roque
 San Vicente
 Silanga (Papaya)
 Socorro
 Totoringon

Climate

Transportation

For decades, Catbalogan City has served as Samar island's main maritime transport gateway as interisland vessels made its port of call at Catbalogan City Seaport before proceeding to Tacloban City.  As the advent of land transport became possible, the interisland maritime transport slowly ceased to operate.

Today, Catbalogan City is a major landport terminal and stopover for interisland bus lines coming and going between Luzon and Mindanao passing through the bridged island of Leyte and Samar.

Catbalogan Airport, also known as Buri Airport, is its air access with commercial flights to Cebu.

Demographics

Economy

Education

Colleges and universities
 Saint Mary’s College of Catbalogan
 Samar College
 Samar State University

References

External links

 
 [ Philippine Standard Geographic Code]
 Philippine Census Information
 Local Governance Performance Management System
 The Supreme Court declares 16 cityhood laws unconstitutional
 Press Statement of the City Government of Catbalogan on Cityhood Issue 
 SC: Cityhood Laws Constitutional – Supreme Court of the Philippines Court News Flash December 21, 2009

 
Cities in Samar (province)
Provincial capitals of the Philippines
Component cities in the Philippines